Justice Subhro Kamal Mukherjee (born 10 October 1955, in Bhagalpur) is a former Chief Justice of the High Court of Karnataka. He remained in that office from February 2016 to October 2017.

Background
Mukherjee comes from a family of lawyers and is a sixth-generation lawyer. He completed his Master of Arts in History and LLB from Calcutta University. He then joined as an Advocate at Calcutta High Court in 1982 practicing mainly in civil and writ matters.

Judicial career
Justice Mukherjee was appointed a Permanent Judge of Calcutta High Court on 15 September 2000. He was transferred to Karnataka High Court on 15 April 2015. Upon transfer of the then Chief Justice Dhirendra Hiralal Waghela to Odisha High Court, he was appointed the Acting Chief Justice of High Court of Karnataka on 1 June 2015. He took oath as the Chief Justice, Karnataka High Court on 23 February 2016. His oath was administered by Vajubhai Vala the Governor of Karnataka.

References

21st-century Indian judges
Living people
1955 births
Chief Justices of the Karnataka High Court
People from New Alipore